Himly may refer to:

 Auguste Himly (1823–1906), French historian and geographer
  (1839–1905), German jurist and civil servant
  (1800–1881), German physicist
  (1769–1831), German civil servant
 Karl Gustav Himly (1772–1837), German surgeon and ophthalmologist

See also
 Himley, a village in Staffordshire, England